Mark Birch (born 5 January 1977) is an English former professional footballer who played in the Football League for Carlisle United.

Career
Birch was born in Stoke-on-Trent and began his career with Stoke City. He failed to break into the first team at Stoke and joined Football Conference side Northwich Victoria in 1998 where he spent two seasons. He joined Third Division side Carlisle United in June 2000 for a fee of £10,000. Birch played 129 times for Carlisle scoring once in a 1–0 win against Macclesfield Town in March 2003. He left Carlisle in August 2003 to join ambitious Scottish Third Division side Gretna. At Gretna he helped them win promotion to the Scottish First Division and reach the 2006 Scottish Cup Final where they lost on penalties to Heart of Midlothian. He returned to England in 2007 playing for Southport and a return to Northwich Victoria.

Coaching career
Birch was appointed Professional Development Phase coach at Carlisle United in June 2019.

Career statistics
Source:

References

1977 births
Living people
Footballers from Stoke-on-Trent
Association football defenders
English footballers
Scottish Football League players
English Football League players
National League (English football) players
Northwich Victoria F.C. players
Carlisle United F.C. players
Gretna F.C. players
Southport F.C. players
Stoke City F.C. players
Penrith F.C. managers
Newcastle Blue Star F.C. players
English football managers